Kog sam đavola tražio u tebi (trans. What the Hell I Saw in You) is the first studio album by Serbian and former Yugoslav hard rock band Griva, released in 1983.

The album features Griva's debut single, a heavy metal cover of Lepa Brena's song "Sitnije, Cile, sitnije", Griva version entitled "Sitnije, sestro, sitnije". The track "Ti si lija, ti si zmija" features Galija member Nenad Milosavljević on harmonica.

Track listing
All the lyrics were written by Zlatko Karavla (lyrics) and Josip Sabo (music), except where noted.
"Sitnije, sestro, sitnije" (K. Kovač, M. Tucaković) - 2:45
"Tebi je važna samo lova" - 2:32
"Svi smo mi ustvari u duši mesari" - 2:42
"Šta je s tobom" - 2:58
"Ti si lija, ti si zmija" - 3:07
"Rolam" - 2:54
"Kog sam đavola tražio u tebi" - 3:51
"Lud za tobom" - 3:07
"Plači, samo plači" - 3:05
"Svega će biti, al' nas nikad više" - 6:48

Personnel
Zlatko Karavla - vocals
Josip Sabo - guitar
Đorđe Jovanović - bass guitar
Laslo Novak - keyboards
Janoš Kazimić - drums

Guest musicians
Nenad Milosavljević - harmonica

Additional personnel
Karolj Kovač - producer
Ivica Vlatković - engineer

References 
Kog sam đavola tražio u tebi at Discogs
 EX YU ROCK enciklopedija 1960-2006,  Janjatović Petar;

External links 
Kog sam đavola tražio u tebi at Discogs

Griva albums
1983 debut albums
Jugoton albums
Heavy metal albums by Serbian artists